Jaghatu, is one of the largest and most populated district of Ghazni province in Afghanistan, west of the city of Ghazni.

Etymology 
The name Jaghatu is derived from the Turkic word of Jagatai.

Demographics 
The ethnic composition of the district includes 73% Hazara and 27% Pashtun.

History 
On 18 May 2020, the Taliban killed two police officers and three civilians on a road in Qyāq Valley of the district and set their bodies on fire.

Agriculture 
 The main crops of wheat, potatoes, clovers and alfalfa.
 Sheep, goats, cows, donkeys and poultry.

See also 
 Districts of Afghanistan
 Hazarajat

References

External links 
 Map of Settlements AIMS, May 2002

 
Districts of Ghazni Province
Hazarajat